The Astley Baronetcy, of Patshull in the County of Stafford, was created in the Baronetage of England on 13 August 1662 for Richard Astley. The second Baronet represented Shrewsbury and Shropshire in the House of Commons. The title became extinct on his death in 1772.

Astley baronets, of Patshull (1662)
Sir Richard Astley, 1st Baronet (c. 1625–1688)
Sir John Astley, 2nd Baronet (1687–1772)

See also
 Astley baronets

Notes

Baronetcies in the Baronetage of England
1662 establishments in England
1772 disestablishments in Great Britain